The Chicago and North Western Railway Class R-1 was a class of 325 American 4-6-0 locomotives. They were built between 1901 and 1908 by the Schenectady Locomotive Works and its successor, the American Locomotive Company; Baldwin Locomotive Works also built 85 of them.

Design
They also had piston stead of slide valves, which made subsequent conversion to superheating easier.

On the R-1 locomotives it was above the rear drivers and was not restricted by the gap between the frames (which was constrained by the track gauge).

Most locomotives had Stephenson valve gear, except for the 1908 batch, which had Walschaerts.

Construction
The locomotives were built by Schenectady Locomotive Works and by the same works under its corporate successor, the American Locomotive Company. Baldwin Locomotive Works also built 85 of the locomotives; Baldwin marked them as 10-36 D in their classification system.

Service
The Class R-1 was designed for freight service, and initially was used that way. As train weights rose and more powerful locomotives were acquired, they were cascaded down to branch line and mixed train service.

Several were converted to oil firing—at least 87 locomotives are known to have run as oil-burners at some point in their C&NW service.

From the 1920s onwards, several locomotives had superheaters installed; some of them having new boilers of a slightly larger design.

Retirements started in 1929, but the last was not retired until 1957.

Preservation
Three locomotives have been preserved:
 CNW 175 (Alco 45272 of 1908) under restoration at the Steam Railroading Institute, Owosso, Michigan;
 CNW 444 (Alco 38526 of 1906) on display at the Forney Transportation Museum, Denver, Colorado;
 CNW 1385 (Alco 42187 of 1907) under restoration at the Mid-Continent Railway Museum, North Freedom, Wisconsin.

References

General references

R-1
Steam locomotives of the United States
4-6-0 locomotives
Schenectady Locomotive Works locomotives
ALCO locomotives
Baldwin locomotives
Railway locomotives introduced in 1901